Nejc Brodar (born 10 July 1982) is a Slovenian cross-country skier. He competed in the men's sprint event at the 2006 Winter Olympics.

References

1982 births
Living people
Slovenian male cross-country skiers
Olympic cross-country skiers of Slovenia
Cross-country skiers at the 2006 Winter Olympics
People from Škofja Loka